Velia may refer to:

Places
Velia, the ancient Greek town named Elea in Italy, now part of the municipality of Ascea, Province of Salerno 
Velian Hill (or Velia), an ancient hill of Rome, Italy
Novi Velia, a municipality of the Province of Salerno in Italy
Ascea-Velia, the semi-official name from 2003 of the Italian municipality of Ascea

Other meanings
Velia (bug), a genus of the riffle bug family Veliidae
 Velia gens, an ancient Roman family
Velia (given name), a female Italian name

See also
Elea (disambiguation)